Bassie & Adriaan was a television programme series focusing on the adventures and lives of a circus duo consisting of clown Bassie and acrobat Adriaan, played by real-life circus duo Bas and Aad van Toor.

Written by Aad van Toor and originally produced by Joop van den Ende, the first series became a television hit in the Netherlands in the spring season of 1978. At its peak, the show attracted over three million viewers, which was noted to be "a lot" for a children's programme. The show ran for nine series, with the last original episode airing in 1996. Between 1980 and 1982, the Van Toor brothers ran their own independent circus, which was named Circus Bassie & Adriaan, which later became a subsidiary of Circus Renz.

Background
Bas van Toor (born 1935) left school at an early age to pursue a number of odd-jobs. At 19 he joined the circus and spent a year on the road. After this, he decided to form an acrobat duo with his brother Aad (born 1942). In 1955, The Melton Brothers/The Crocksons were born. In 1965, they embarked on what was planned to be a two-year stint abroad; they stayed abroad ten years instead. During this period they befriended Siegfried & Roy, incorporated the wives into their act (The Four Crocksons) and staged children's matinees in Dutch, German and English while residing in Spain for nightclub-shows. The seeds for Bassie & Adriaan were sown in 1964 when the brothers did a clown act as part of Rudi Carrell's travelling circus. The brothers wrote a clown act for Pipo de Clown, and incorporated themselves into it as well. It was so successful that the brothers were invited to make their own series under the scrutiny of Joop van den Ende.

History

1978–1982: First series and Circus Bassie en Adriaan

In January 1978, TROS released the first series of Bassie & Adriaan, titled De avonturen van Bassie en Adriaan (The adventures of Bassie and Adriaan). With its crossover potential, the series became the most watched children's series of the first half of 1978. As a result, the show was soon renewed for a second season, which received just as high viewing figures. Within the space of two years, three series were shot and released.

In 1980, Joop van den Ende founded a circus around the duo and toured with it throughout the country. The circus proved popular in its first year and sold out nearly every single show.

1982–1987: Closure of the circus, split from Joop van den Ende, split from and return to TROS
After the release of De huilende professor in 1982, TROS saw the appreciation ratings for the series go down and proposed the Van Toor brothers to put the series on halt for a year to give the older series more time to be rebroadcast. Bas van Toor claimed that TROS did not want the brothers anymore, while the head of entertainment of the broadcaster stated that the brothers were allowed to go to other broadcasters if they pleased.

Meanwhile, the brothers Van Toor also ended their long-term collaboration with producer Joop van den Ende after he left in his position of director at Circus Bassie & Adriaan, which left the brothers taking over the daily management of the business. The brothers were soon overworked and let the circus collapse in favour of their own well-being. On top of that, the costs had outweighed the earnings.

They then started their collaboration with Belgian broadcaster BRT, for which they produced several mini-series. BRT was also interested in commissioning a long series with proper episodes. In 1985, TROS commissioned a new series by the duo, which made their return to the TROS official.

1987–1996: Later series
In 1987, their first self-produced series, Het geheim van de schatkaart was released. It quickly became the most appreciated television programme of the Netherlands with an average of 7.7 out of 10. Its premiere on 9 January 1987 received a 7.6 and amassed to an audience share of 11%, outscoring other popular television programmes for adults. As a result of the success, the brothers received a contract to produce two more series.

1997–2003: Farewell tour and Aad van Toor's illness

In October 2002 Bassie & Adriaan announced their farewell tour. The final show, planned for January 4, 2004, was to include a guest appearance by the three crooks, however the tour prematurely ended on July 31, 2003 as Aad van Toor was diagnosed with cancer. At the end of the last show, when his relatives brought him flowers, he burst into tears. "You want more?" he asked as usual. "Well so do I, but unfortunately I'm sick. I have to go to hospital".

2003–present: Film appearance and revived success
In 2003, the Dutch branch of Nickelodeon bought the rights to show several seasons of Bassie & Adriaan series on their channel. These reruns proved a success as it quickly became the channels most watched programme at the time, collecting almost half a million viewers per episode. Aad van Toor hosted a special 24-hour marathon of episodes for the channel on New Year's Day 2004.

In September 2014, the show's theme song "Hallo Vriendjes" became a viral internet sensation when Dutch teens and students challenged their international friends to sing along to the lyrics.

In 2015, the Van Toor brothers played Bassie and Adriaan in the picture Koen en Keet en de speurtocht naar Bassie & Adriaan.

In 2019, their production company started uploading their episodes on YouTube, after they had registered a channel in 2012. This proved popular, as their old episodes got over 90 million views all together. It led Veronica's Superguide joke that "you do not have to young and handsome to become a YouTube success". The brothers stated that they initially had wanted to sell their series to Netflix, but that Netflix had rejected them because of the series' poor picture quality.

The Van Toor brothers were in a long-term legal battle with actor Paul van Gorcum, who played the Baron in several series. Together with three other actors, they sued the Van Toor brothers over their own right on royalty payments for the series produced with Joop van den Ende. In 2020, the Rotterdam district court ruled that Van Toor brothers had to pay damages of €15,000 in total to four actors including Van Gorcum. This sum was significantly less than the claimed €193,000. The district court ruled that the actors had been underpaid but that the claimed sum was disproportional to the screentime that the actors had had in series.

Main characters
 Adriaan (Aad van Toor) - an acrobat in a blue (originally purple) 1970s-style satin shirt; his philosophy is: "Wat er ook gebeurt, altijd blijven lachen." (Translation: "Whatever happens, always keep smiling"). Adriaan is the wiser half of the duo, often creating solutions to their problems.
 Bassie (Bas van Toor) - ginger-haired red-nosed clown who wears a red tartan-jacket and green trousers; he's fond of cream-cakes, and calls himself "stupid, but not smart". Bassie is the more relaxed one with a strong sense of humour.

Episodes

In other media
The characters received their own comic strip series between 1983 and 1985, drawn by Frans Verschoor.

Sources

References
 http://www.beeldengeluidwiki.nl/ 
 http://www.adriaan-homepage.nl/

External links

 Homepage of Bassie and Adriaan (in Dutch)
 Homepage of Adriaan (in Dutch)
 Homepage of Bassie (in Dutch)
 

1978 Dutch television series debuts
Dutch clowns
Dutch children's television series
Dutch comedy duos
Comedy theatre characters
Comedy television characters
Theatre characters introduced in 1978
Television characters introduced in 1978
Television duos
Entertainer duos
People from Maassluis
Circus television shows
Dutch-language television shows
Television shows about clowns
Television shows adapted into comics
Television shows adapted into plays
Television shows adapted into radio programs
Male characters in theatre
Male characters in television